National Airways Ethiopia, formerly known as Air Ethiopia, is a private airline based in Addis Ababa, Ethiopia. It was established in 2007 and has been operating charter services since 2009.

History
National Airways was founded as Air Ethiopia in November 2007 by Abera Lemi and rebranded Addis Airlines in 2009. He had previously worked for the Ethiopian flag carrier, Ethiopian Airlines. In 2010 the airline was renamed to the current name.

In November 2017 the airline purchased three Embraer ERJ 145 aircraft from NovoAir, an airline from Bangladesh, with the financial backing of Airstream International Group (AIG).

In September 2019, the airline announced it had been permitted to start operating domestic (scheduled) services by the Ethiopian Civil Aviation Authority (ECAA), although the ECAA clarified that the approval was "in principle," and that they were "still working on the details". 

As of May 2021, the company had not launched scheduled service.

Fleet 
As of September 2019, National Airways Ethiopia operated the following aircraft:

References

External links

	

Airlines established in 2007
2007 establishments in Ethiopia